Generation Why is a true crime podcast that debuted in 2012. According to a 2020 study, it was the most popular true crime podcast in the United States. It is recorded in Kansas City and distributed by Wondery.

See also
 Criminology (podcast)

References

Crime podcasts
2012 establishments in Kansas
American podcasts